Jack Colleran (born May 1993), known professionally as MMOTHS, is an Irish electronic musician.

Biography 
Colleran was born in Newbridge, County Kildare. He has played piano since he was five years old. He played in several bands while in school and, in 2011, began making music on his laptop using a demo version of Ableton Live. He released the demo on SoundCloud a week later under the stage name MMOTHS. 

Having released a number of tracks on SoundCloud, MMOTHS was approached by and then signed to Los Angeles music label SQE Music. SQE released his self-titled debut EP in March 2012, which featured guest vocals from Superhumanoids and Keep Shelly in Athens. The EP was described by This Is Fake DIY as "an utterly beautiful blend of electronics that are somehow crafted to evolve with an aching sense of soulful intimacy".

MMOTHS performed at the South by Southwest festival in April 2012. In August, he supported At the Drive-In at the O2 Academy in Brixton, and he has also opened for Aphex Twin.

MMOTHS' EP entitled Diaries was released 5 March 2013 and features vocals by Holly Miranda and Young & Sick.

Discography

Studio albums

Extended plays

Compilation appearances 
Annie Mac Presents 2012 (2012), Island: "Over You"

References

External links 

MMOTHS at Discogs

1993 births
Living people
Musicians from County Kildare
Irish electronic musicians
Ableton Live users